Galloping Thunder is a 1927 American silent Western film directed by Scott Pembroke and starring Bob Custer, Anne Sheridan and J.P. Lockney.

Cast
 Bob Custer as Kincaid Currier 
 Anne Sheridan as Judith Lamb 
 J.P. Lockney as Oliver Lamb 
 Richard Neill as Dallas 
 Fernando Gálvez as Lash M'Graw

References

External links
 

1927 films
1927 Western (genre) films
American black-and-white films
Films directed by Scott Pembroke
Film Booking Offices of America films
Silent American Western (genre) films
1920s English-language films
1920s American films